Nikulino is a rural locality (a village) in Posyolok Anopino, Gus-Khrustalny District, Vladimir Oblast, Russia. The population was 328 in 2010. There are three streets.

Geography 
Nikulino is located 12 km east of Gus-Khrustalny (the district's administrative centre) by road. Vyoshki is the nearest rural locality.

References 

Rural localities in Gus-Khrustalny District